Offleben is a former municipality in the district of Helmstedt, in Lower Saxony, Germany. It was Incorporated into the newly formed Büddenstedt on 1 March 1974. Since 1 July 2017 Offleben is part of Helmstedt. Offleben is an Ortschaft (municipal division) of the town Helmstedt, and includes the villages Offleben, Reinsdorf and Hohnsleben.

History
It is estimated that Offleben was established between 822 and 875 as „Uffenleva“. First records are from 1151.

References

Helmstedt (district)
Former municipalities in Lower Saxony